Mazinsky is a rural locality (a khutor) in Tishanskoye Rural Settlement, Nekhayevsky District, Volgograd Oblast, Russia. The population was 171 as of 2010. There are 12 streets.

Geography 
Mazinsky is located 13 km southeast of Nekhayevskaya (the district's administrative centre) by road. Artanovsky is the nearest rural locality.

References 

Rural localities in Nekhayevsky District